Shabei Station is an elevated station of Line 6 on the Guangzhou Metro. The station is one of three Guangzhou Metro stations on the island of Jinshazhou in Baiyun District, and is the closest station to the Jinshouzhou Bridge. It started operation on 28 December 2013. From 19 June 2017, during the peak morning period from 07:45 to 08:45, metro authorities began imposing passenger limits.

Station layout

Exits

References

Guangzhou Metro stations in Baiyun District
Railway stations in China opened in 2013